Fortunat (English: Fortunate) is a 1960 Franco-Italian co-production  motion picture comedy directed and written by Alex Joffé,  based on a novel by Michel Breitman. The film stars Bourvil and Michèle Morgan.

It tells the story of a lazy man who helps a sociable lady and her children from the Nazis.

Plot
In Occupied France during the Second World War, destiny brings together the poacher Fortunat, an honest guy with a weakness for drink, and Juliette, an elegant woman with two children: Pierre and Maurice. Miss Massillon, a helpful teacher, tries to help Juliette who is being hunted by the Nazis after the arrest of her husband, a leader of the Resistance. Juliette and her children must reach the French-controlled zone in the south, to take refuge in Toulouse. For that it is necessary for them to cross the Demarcation line. It is Fortunat who is charged with leading the two children and their mother to safety. Close links will link Fortunat and Juliette. A scene of film implies clearly that they have a sexual relationship at least once. After the Liberation of France, Juliette is reunited with her husband, and Fortunat returns to his life as a single man.

Cast
Michèle Morgan  - Juliette  
Bourvil  - Fortunat  
Gaby Morlay  - Miss Massillon  
Rosy Varte  - Mrs. Falk

External links
Fortunat at Films de France 
Fortunat from Time Out Film Guide

1960 films
French comedy films
Italian comedy films
Films set in 1942
1960s French films
1960s Italian films